Transit is an original novel written by Ben Aaronovitch and based on the long-running British science fiction television series Doctor Who. It features the Seventh Doctor, Bernice and the first appearance of Kadiatu Lethbridge-Stewart. A prelude to the novel, also penned by Aaronovitch, appeared in Doctor Who Magazine #195.

Plot

Human engineers are preparing to open a new section of the Sol Transit System (STS), a mass transit system that uses transmat technology to send trains instantly between planets, from the solar system to Arcturus. The system begins to experience power drains, which the technicians, known as "Floozies", cannot determine the cause. At Lunarversity on the moon, Kadiatu Lethbridge-Stewart is experiencing financial difficulty and agrees to deliver a batch of drugs to Old Sam, one of the Floozies, for a local dealer. Old Sam is a veteran of the Ten-thousand Day War against the Martians and now cannot survive without combat drugs given to him by the army. Having made the drop off and collected a moneypin in payment, Kadiatu joins the Floozies for a wild night out across the Solar System and sleeps with one named Blondie. The following morning, she wakes up in Beijing, without the moneypin she needs to get home and pay her debts. During the opening ceremony of the Arcturus extension, an unknown force blasts through the tunnel, killing everything in its path. Dodging a ticket inspector, Kadiatu makes her way to King's Cross station as the TARDIS materialises. As the Doctor and Bernice exit the TARDIS, the blast wave hits the station—Bernice and the TARDIS are caught in the blast and disappear, but the Doctor pulls Kadiatu to safety.

With the main line shut down till the damage can be repaired, the Doctor cannot retrieve the TARDIS or Benny, and remains with Kadiatu. The pair visit Kadiatu's elderly family friend and blind war veteran, Francine, at her bar on Mars. She agrees to use her underworld contacts to find Blondie (who Kadiatu assumes stole the moneypin while they were making love), and tells Kadiatu that her new friend has two hearts, confirming her suspicions. Long ago, her father told her stories about his grandfather and the mysterious time traveller known as the Doctor. The two go to a cafe in Paris, where the Doctor gets drunk and passes out celebrating the universe's 13500020012th birthday.

Benny arrives at Lowell depot a rundown slum on Pluto and meets two prostitutes, Zamina and Roberta. Unknown to Benny, Roberta is a childhood lover of Blondie who resents him for escaping the slum. Roberta has Kadiatu's moneypin, which she took after having seen her and Blondie making love. Behiaving strangely, Benny demands to be taken to a local gang leader, whom she then encourages to take over the slum. Violence spreads across the slum, killing many including Roberta and eventually leading to military intervention and evacuation of the survivors.

The Doctor awakens in Kadiatu's room at the Lunarversity and, looking through her belongings, realises she has been researching his visits to Earth and that she was genetically engineered. He also discovers that she is close to developing a time machine. Unsure how to act, the Doctor first solves Kadiatu's problem with the drug dealers and then searches for Benny, stowing away on a maintenance train heading to the relief zone on Pluto.

A mysterious train-shaped object begins moving through the tunnels, swallowing passengers and pirate free-surfers (who use special boards to traverse the tunnels illegally). Its victims are re-engineered into mutant soldiers to serve the intelligence that has invaded the tunnels. Francine contacts Old Sam about Blondie, but he convinces them that he knows nothing about the moneypin. Using the tunnel surveillance system, they locate Kadiatu and the Doctor heading for Pluto. Old Sam and Blondie set off to investigate, intending to rescue Kadiatu.

The Doctor finds the TARDIS embedded in a concrete wall at the end of the line. While the Doctor tries to work out a way to free it, the pair are attacked by Benny. The intelligence has possessed her, but it does not recognise the Doctor as a threat. Kadiatu realises that her instinctive response to danger is to kill, and that her punches are capable of causing fatal injuries. Old Sam and Blondie arrive and Benny escapes, joining Zamina on a refugee train heading for Mars. Zamina realises that Benny caused the riots for just this purpose.

Flashbacks reveal that Kadiatu's father, Yembe, is a descendant of Alistair Lethbridge-Stewart and an African woman with whom he had a brief relationship during his service in Africa. Years later Yembe Lethbridge-Stewart had been a soldier in the war against the Martians, where he met Francine. After the war, Francine learnt from a mysterious hacker that a facility outside Leipzig was being used to genetically engineer super-soldiers. Yembe burnt the facility to the ground, but spared a single baby whom he and Francine adopted.

The Doctor, Kadiatu and Blondie return the Doctor's house on Allen Road in Kent. While Kadiatu and Blondie make love, the Doctor constructs a device for hacking into the tunnel network. The Doctor deduces that the intelligence invading the tunnels is from another dimension and operates similarly to a computer virus using a neural computer system. He also learns that the STS system has become self-aware, and communicates with it via a hologram of television anchorman, Yak Harris. The hologram confirms the Doctor's theory, which they then report to the STS executives in London. At the same time, the Floozies identify an energy build up, indicating that the hole between dimensions is about to open again.

On Mars, Benny has gained access to the STS system, but the controlling influence weakens as she gets further from the tunnels. She recovers enough to send Zamina to the Doctor for help. The Doctor and Kadiatu arrive on Mars, in time to see Benny fleeing from the human colony, killing anyone in her way. They follow, and corner her in an Ice Warrior nest. Benny reveals a gun and Kadiatu shoots her. As the sleeping warriors begin to revive, the Doctor realises that this "Benny" is a duplicate created to distract him. Kadiatu summons Francine to fly them back to the settlement. En route, the craft accidentally activates a missile defence system, but Francine's manages to land the craft. Another duplicate of Benny enters a STS reactor and overloads the power, creating enough energy to open the breach. The Doctor sends the Floozies to the end of the line to build a machine  to his specifications and connected to the TARDIS. The group—including Benny, who is disguised as one of the station's staff—come under attack by the mutant creatures, and Blondie is among the fatalities.

The Doctor commandeers a freesurf board and heads through the tunnels to the station, picking up a piece of software hitch-hiking in the system along the way. Barely surviving the landing, the Doctor sees the breach open. The virus was an agent laying the groundwork for the real invader to emerge—it is nameless, but the Doctor calls it Fred. The Doctor uses the machine to fire a burst of artron energy from the TARDIS. Fred retreats through the breach, taking Benny with it and the Doctor follows.

In the other dimension, the Doctor appears before its world's ruler to ask for Benny's return. Unlike Fred, the ruler realises how dangerous the Doctor is, and attempts to destroy him. At that moment, Kadiatu appears, distracting Fred long enough for the Doctor to push the hitch-hiker into Benny's mind, forcing Fred out. The Yak Harris software remains in the alternative dimension achieve its full potential, and the Doctor, Benny and Kadiatu return to their reality moments before the gateway collapses. The Doctor visits the Stone Mountain computer archive and erases evidence of his existence, then sends Old Sam to the Ice Warrior nest, suggesting he offer the reviving warriors a gesture of peace. The surviving Floozies cut the TARDIS from the wall and the Doctor and Benny depart.

Some months later, Kadiatu has a job at STS, gaining access to the resources she needs to build her time machine. Her work complete, she destroys her research and sets off through the time vortex to catch up with the Doctor.

Notes
The novel was controversial on its initial publication, being the first Doctor Who story in any medium to feature coarse language, drug use, and sex. This reflected the adult readership of the New Adventures, as well as the age of most Doctor Who fans at the time; prior to this, the novels had generally stayed within the same boundaries as the TV series. Aaronovitch noted that previous New Adventures had already alluded to characters having sexual relations and that all he did in this novel was put it "on screen". Complaints about swearing in latter New Adventures eventually resulted in the introduction of the substitute swear word "cruk", in the manner of television series such as Porridge and Red Dwarf.

The novel is set in an inter-planetary transport network that evolved out of the London Underground. Trains teleport through tunnels in the space-time continuum between fixed points at faster-than-light speeds. King's Cross station is the terminus for a Central Line that connects human colonies throughout the solar system. As the story opens, the network is about to be extended to its first extra-solar location, in Arcturus (this is called the "Stunnel", in imitation of the "Chunnel").

The novel continues from The Seeds of Death, with the Transit network as an offshoot of the T-Mat system. Though no Ice Warriors are encountered, the Doctor and Kadiatu explore one of their dormant nests. Ahistory by Lance Parkin describes the novel as taking place "at least a generation" after the serial, based on a "future history" document by Aaronovitch.

The mysterious hitch-hiker Francine encounters in cyberspace is the future "Merlin" Doctor, as he is described in Marc Platt's novelisation of Aaronvoitch's serial Battlefield.

References

External links
Transit Prelude
The Cloister Library - Transit

1992 British novels
1992 science fiction novels
Virgin New Adventures
Novels by Ben Aaronovitch
Seventh Doctor novels